The Oceania Para-Badminton Championships is a tournament organized by the Para Badminton World Federation (PBWF) which has now merged with the BWF. This tournament is hosted to crown the best para-badminton players in Oceania.

The inaugural edition of the tournament was hosted in Geelong, Australia in 2018.

Championships

Individual championships 
The table below states all the host cities (and their countries) of the Oceanian Championships.

All-time medal table

Past winners

2018 Geelong

2020 Ballarat

2022 Melbourne 
Melbourne was selected to host the tournament in 2022.

See also 

 Oceania Badminton Championships

Note

References 

 
Badminton
Oceania